White Township is a township in Cambria County, Pennsylvania, United States. The population was 836 at the 2010 census. It is part of the Johnstown, Pennsylvania Metropolitan Statistical Area.

Geography
The township is bordered by Clearfield County to the north. The township's eastern border follows Clearfield Creek, a north-flowing tributary of the West Branch Susquehanna River. The primary feature in the township is Prince Gallitzin State Park, which occupies most of the central and southern parts of the township. The park surrounds Glendale Lake, a reservoir on Beaverdam Run, which flows north into Clearfield Creek.

Communities

Unincorporated communities

 Beaver Valley
 Fiske
 Glendale

Demographics

As of the census of 2000, there were 813 people, 311 households, and 226 families residing in the township.  The population density was 40.3 people per square mile (15.5/km2).  There were 490 housing units at an average density of 24.3/sq mi (9.4/km2).  The racial makeup of the township was 96.56% White, 0.74% African American, 1.97% Asian, 0.49% from other races, and 0.25% from two or more races. Hispanic or Latino of any race were 0.74% of the population.

There were 311 households, out of which 26.7% had children under the age of 18 living with them, 61.4% were married couples living together, 6.1% had a female householder with no husband present, and 27.3% were non-families. 22.5% of all households were made up of individuals, and 7.7% had someone living alone who was 65 years of age or older.  The average household size was 2.47 and the average family size was 2.87.

In the township the population was spread out, with 20.3% under the age of 18, 6.8% from 18 to 24, 28.7% from 25 to 44, 27.7% from 45 to 64, and 16.6% who were 65 years of age or older.  The median age was 41 years. For every 100 females there were 117.4 males.  For every 100 females age 18 and over, there were 109.0 males.

The median income for a household in the township was $31,458, and the median income for a family was $33,846. Males had a median income of $30,833 versus $18,359 for females. The per capita income for the township was $14,007.  About 6.9% of families and 13.3% of the population were below the poverty line, including 9.6% of those under age 18 and 7.8% of those age 65 or over.

Recreation
Most of Prince Gallitzin State Park occupies the western end of the township, and portions of the Pennsylvania State Game Lands Number 108 are located in the township.

References

External links
White Township official website

Populated places established in 1838
Townships in Cambria County, Pennsylvania
1838 establishments in Pennsylvania